"Rush Rush" is a song by American singer Debbie Harry, released as the fourth and final single from the soundtrack to the 1983 film Scarface.

Song information
"Rush Rush" was the first single Harry released after Blondie broke up in 1982, and was one of the several projects she worked on in between her first and second solo albums. It was Harry's second collaboration with Italian producer Giorgio Moroder, the first being Blondie's 1980 number-one single "Call Me" (from the 1980 film American Gigolo). The song was a reference to drug use, "llello" being a Spanish colloquialism for cocaine.

"Rush Rush" was released both as a 7-inch single and an extended 12-inch, the A-side of which would later be included on the 1988 Blondie/Debbie Harry remix compilation Once More into the Bleach, as well as Harry's 1999 compilation Most of All: The Best of Deborah Harry. A music video was produced, but it was primarily a montage of clips from Harry's past videos including ones from Blondie.

In the United States, "Rush Rush" peaked at number 105 on the US Bubbling Under Hot 100 chart and number 28 on the Dance/Disco Top 80 chart. The single also peaked at number 87 on the UK Singles Chart.

The song was also featured in the 2001 video game Grand Theft Auto III on the fictional in-game radio station "Flashback 95.6" (Flashback FM) alongside four other songs from the Scarface soundtrack. The song also appears in the 1986 Tom Hanks film The Money Pit. It was also used in the video game Scarface: The World Is Yours.

The song was covered by the British band Happy Mondays for their 2007 album Uncle Dysfunktional. The song was also sampled by the Beatnuts for their 2002 song "Yae Yo". In 2008, Septimus Orion covered the song on its debut studio album, Caged, which also features a remix of "Rush Rush" called the "Trip mix".

Track listings
US 7-inch single
A. "Rush Rush" – 3:33
B. "Dance Dance Dance" (performed by Beth Anderson) – 2:41

UK 7-inch single
A. "Rush Rush" – 3:33
B. "Rush Rush" (Dub Version) – 3:26

US and UK 12-inch single
A. "Rush Rush" (Extended Version) – 4:45
B. "Rush Rush" (Extended Dub Version) – 4:45

Charts

See also
 List of post-disco artists and songs

References

1983 singles
1983 songs
Chrysalis Records singles
Debbie Harry songs
Post-disco songs
Scarface (1983 film)
Song recordings produced by Giorgio Moroder
Songs about cocaine
Songs written by Debbie Harry
Songs written by Giorgio Moroder
Songs written for films